Bartłomiej Stolc (born 3 April 1983) is a former Polish footballer who played as a forward. Stolc spent his early years playing for his local team Gryf Wejherowo progressing through their youth sides. In 2000 Stolc moved to Lechia Gdańsk, and joined the new Lechia Gdańsk entity which was separate from the Lechia-Polonia Gdańsk team. The new Lechia Gdańsk team had been formed, allowing the young Stolc to develop and flourished scoring many goals. By the time he had turned 20, Stolc had already played 76 games for Lechia in all competitions, scoring 81 goals. Other known teams Stolc has played for include Kaszuby Połchowo, and Norwegian teams Skedsmo FK, Rælingen FK, and Aurskog-Finstadbru SK.

References

1983 births
Lechia Gdańsk players
Polish footballers
People from Wejherowo
Association football forwards
Sportspeople from Pomeranian Voivodeship
Living people